The Thai FA Futsal Cup is a futsal cup competition in Thailand. It was established in 2010. GH Bank R-bac (later known as Chonburi Bluewave) won the first edition of the tournament.

The tournament plays on knock-out basis, so the winner of the tournament is the unbeaten team in each edition. All clubs of Futsal Thailand League and Thailand Division 1 Futsal League automatically qualified for the tournament while non-league teams, such as school, futsal academies, universities, amateur or semi-pro futsal teams, etc. joined the qualification stage of the tournament.

List of winners

References 

Futsal competitions in Thailand